Head cones, also known as perfume cones or wax cones were a type of conical ornament worn atop the head in ancient Egypt. They are often depicted on paintings and bas-reliefs of the era, but were not found as archaeological evidence until 2019.

Head cone outfit

People wearing the cones are often depicted wearing a long, translucent dress, and on some occasions a kilt, with a fold of the dress draped over the left shoulder. In coloration, the dress often resembles the cone itself. The skirt of the dress is white while the upper portion is an orange or amber color. Distinct lines and squiggles are sometimes painted running through the orange portion and over the person's arms, and the bottom of the orange portion often terminates in a streaky pattern that seems to fade into the white part of the dress.

Both men and women wearing the cone almost always wear a headband with ornamentation running around the front and sides of the head, with a string circling around the back. A similar band can sometimes be seen going around the cone itself. A lotus flower drapes over the front of the headband, or sometimes comes out of the front of the band or out of the cone itself. In a few instances where there is no lotus flower on the head, it can be seen instead in the wearer's hand near their face.  Since these instances are portrayed adjacent to other people wearing the flower, it may be supposed that the wearer has removed the flower for the purpose of smelling it.  

In a few depictions, where several seated women are being attended by young, nude girls, it can be seen that one or two of the women wear no headband. White strips dangle from the hands of the girls, and it may be supposed that the girls are in the process of distributing the bands. Other girls bear cones in their hands as they attend to the women.

Function 
Perfume cones were presumably made of a mixture of oils, resins and fat, and containing myrrh. Images of the era show people wearing them on wigs or on shaved heads. The slow melting of the cones due to bodily heat would have spread the fragrance.

Depiction 
The first known depiction of the perfume cones dates from the reign of Hatshepsut, in scenes of banquet or funeral. From then on, they are often seen in scenes of worship and funerals. From the Third Intermediate Period, their depiction is limited to scene of worship.

The shape of the cones varies over the 18th and 19th Dynasties, which constitutes an aid for dating the works. From the 20th Dynasty onwards, the depiction of the cones becomes schematic.

Notes and references

Notes

Bibliography 

 Rainer Hannig: Großes Handwörterbuch Ägyptisch-Deutsch: (2800-950 v. Chr.). von Zabern, Mainz 2006, p. 258.
 Monika Silke Randl: Die Entwicklung der Salbkegel im Flachbild. Diplomarbeit, Universität Wien 2008
Ancient Egyptian culture
Cosmetics
Perfumes
Headgear